Ganesh Joshi is an Indian politician and currently, a State Cabinet Minister of Government of Uttarakhand under the Chief Minister Pushkar Singh Dhami. He is a member of the Bharatiya Janata Party. Joshi is a 4th time member of the Uttarakhand Legislative Assembly from the Mussoorie constituency in Dehradun district.

Originally from Pithoragarh district in Uttarakhand, Ganesh Joshi was born in Meerut City in 1958 where his father, Late Shri Shyam Dutt Joshi was posted as a jawan of the Indian Army. Second eldest among five siblings, his childhood was spent in Meerut, Haridwar and Dehradun. He served in the Indian Army as a soldier from 1976 to 1983.

Political background
Joined Bharatiya Janata Party as a member in 1984 and served different positions as below.
Secretary, Bharatiya Janta Yuva Morcha, Dehradun City (1985–89)
Vice President, Bharatiya Janta Yuva Morcha, Dehradun City (1989–92)
President, Bharatiya Janta Yuva Morcha, Dehradun City (1994–96)
Mandal prabhari, Bharatiya Janata Yuva Morch, Garhwal Mandal (1996–98)
Sec. BJP, Dehradun City (1998-2000)
District Gen. Sec, BJP, Dehradun Mahanagar (2000-2002)
State General Secretary, Local Bodies cell, Uttaranchal
Elected 2007 MLA from Rajpur constituency
Nominated 2009 Chairperson of Housing committee of Uttarakhand Legislative Assembly
Elected in 2012 MLA from Mussoorie constituency
Elected in 2017 MLA from Mussoorie constituency
Elected in 2022 MLA from Mussoorie constituency

Political activities
In 1991 during Ram Janam Bhoomi Movement injured and arrested by police in lathicharge.
During Uttarakhand Movement injured in agitation at DIG Campus, Dehradun on 3 October 1994.
On 16 December 1994 injured and arrested at Police Control Room and was sent to Bareilly Central Jail for 27 days.
Also participated actively in many other agitations and rallies.
On 15 February 2017, Sonia Gandhi's son-in-law Robert Vadra criticized the BJP for allowing Joshi to run in the 2017 Assembly election having allegedly thrashed and kicked a police horse at a protest in March 2016, injuring its legs which eventually led to its death a month later.

References 

 Ganesh Joshi sworn as minister.
 Ganesh Joshi wins 4th time from Mussoorie constituency.

External links
Ganesh Joshi, MLA, Mussoorie 

Bharatiya Janata Party politicians from Uttarakhand
Living people
Uttarakhand MLAs 2007–2012
Year of birth missing (living people)
Uttarakhand MLAs 2012–2017
Uttarakhand MLAs 2017–2022
Uttarakhand MLAs 2022–2027